Mehmet Şeref Aykut (1874 – 18 May 1939) was a Turkish politician, who was an early key member of both the Turkish National Movement and the CHP.

References 

1874 births
1939 deaths
Place of death missing
People from Edirne
Republican People's Party (Turkey) politicians
20th-century Turkish politicians